The Cosmic Connection: An Extraterrestrial Perspective is a book by the astronomer Carl Sagan, produced by Jerome Agel. It was originally published in 1973; an expanded edition with contributions from Freeman Dyson, David Morrison, and Ann Druyan was published in 2000 under the title Carl Sagan's Cosmic Connection. The book contains artwork by Jon Lomberg and other artists. The book was listed as number thirteen in a list of the "25 Greatest Science Books of All Time" by Discover Magazine in 2006.

Summary
Sagan covers several topics, and focuses mainly on the possibility of extraterrestrial intelligence, the likelihood of the existence of more advanced civilizations, and their distribution in the local galaxy, and in the universe. He describes the hypothetical opinions of more advanced intelligences and their views of the Earth, as well as communication with mankind. He also discusses the popularity of UFO sightings and attempts mathematically to portray the probability of such events. Sagan also discusses his view of astrology as a pseudoscience.

References

External links
Cambridge catalogue listing

1973 non-fiction books
American non-fiction books
Astronomy books
Books about extraterrestrial life
English-language books
Popular physics books
Works by Carl Sagan